Sundanese-Baduy languages or simply Sundanese languages is one of the branches of several debatable language families, such as, Malayo-Sumbawan and Greater North Borneo in one Austronesian language family. Members in this language family include Sundanese along with dialects and Baduy which are linguistically related to Sundanese with a degree of mutual intelligibility which is high but is often considered a separate language for ethnic and cultural reasons. This language family is spoken mainly in the western part of the Java Island, as well as in other areas of Indonesia where diaspora of one of the speakers of this language family reside.

The most prominent language of this language family is Sundanese with the number of native speakers more than 40 million, spread over various regions of Indonesia.

Classification 
According to the classification Glottolog (2022) and Ethnologue, The Sundanese language family consists of 2 languages, namely Sundanese and Baduy, Sundanese itself according to the classification of the glottologist is divided into several types of dialects, which are divided as follows.

 Sundanese-Baduy
 Sundanese
 Banten
 Bogor
 Brebes
 Ciamis
 Central-Eastern Sundanese
 Cirebon
 Indramayu
 Kuningan
 Majalengka
 Priangan
 Bandung
 Garut
 Sumedang
 Tasikmalaya
 Baduy
 Old Sundanese

References

Bibliography

External links
 Sundanese subgroup at MultiTree: A Digital Library of Language Relationships
 Sundanese subgroup at Ethnologue

Sundanese language
Malayo-Polynesian languages
Austronesian languages